Daat or DAAT may refer to:

Da'at
, Hebrew website whose main content is texts in the fields of Judaism collected from printed sources 
 ICAO: DAAT for the Aguenar – Hadj Bey Akhamok Airport
 Drug and Alcohol Action Team
Devon Air Ambulance Trust

See also